Palfuria harpago is a spider species of the family Zodariidae.

Etymology
The species name harpago means harpoon in Latin. It refers to the shape of the dorsal tibial apophysis as seen from the dorsolateral side.

Distribution
P. harpago is only known from Ovamboland, Namibia.

References

Endemic fauna of Namibia
Zodariidae
Spiders of Africa
Spiders described in 2001